Yuri Lenon Alemao (born 16 May 1985), is an Indian politician and businessperson from Goa. He is the current member of the Goa Legislative Assembly from the Cuncolim Assembly constituency. Alemao won the Cuncolim Constituency on Indian National Congress in 2022 Goa Legislative Assembly election. He defeated former MLA Clafasio Dias of the Bharatiya Janata Party by a margin of 6,632 votes. On 20 September 2022, he was appointed the Congress Legislature party leader in Goa Assembly.

Early life and education
Yuri Lenon Alemao was born to Joaquim Alemao, the former Urban development minister and MLA of Cuncolim Assembly Constituency, in Carmona, Goa. He completed his Secondary School Certificate from Goa and has a commercial pilot licence from Basair Aviation College, New South Wales, Sydney, Australia from 2006.

Personal life
Alemao is married to Fatima Fernandes Alemao (née Fernandes), the couple have a son. He currently resides in Cuncolim, Goa.

References

1985 births
Living people
Indian National Congress politicians from Goa
Indian businesspeople
Goa MLAs 2022–2027